Félix Martins Salvador (born 1 August 1932) is a former Portuguese footballer who played as forward.

External links 
 
 

1932 births
Living people
Portuguese footballers
Primeira Liga players
S.L. Benfica footballers
Portugal international footballers
Association football forwards